Prince Patrick Kallon (born 3 February 2002) is an Indonesian professional footballer who plays as a forward for Liga 1 club Dewa United.

Club career

PSM Makassar
He was signed for PSM Makassar to play in Liga 1 in the 2021 season. Kallon made his professional debut on 18 January 2022 in a match against Persik Kediri as a substitute for Rizky Eka Pratama in the 66th minute at the Ngurah Rai Stadium, Denpasar.

Dewa United
Kallon was signed for Dewa United to play in Liga 1 in the 2022–23 season.

Career statistics

Club

Notes

Personal life
He is the son of the legend of PSM Makassar at that time Musa Kallon and the nephew of former Inter Milan player Mohamed Kallon.

References

External links
 Prince Kallon at Soccerway
 Prince Kallon at Liga Indonesia

2002 births
Living people
People from Tabanan Regency
Sportspeople of Sierra Leonean descent
Sportspeople from Bali
Indonesian footballers
Liga 1 (Indonesia) players
PSM Makassar players
Dewa United F.C. players
Association football forwards